A ballot is a device used to record choices made by voters.

Ballot may also refer to:
 Ballot (automobile), a defunct French automobile manufacturer
 Ballot (horse), an American two-time Champion Thoroughbred racehorse
 Ballots, Mayenne, a commune in northwestern France